Mu Si is a tambon (subdistrict) of Pak Chong District, Nakhon Ratchasima Province, northeast Thailand.

Description
Mu Si is an area adjacent to the Khao Yai National Park, the largest and most fertile forest in the country. Therefore, there are often wild animals such as elephants invading to find food in the farmland of the locals.

The term "Mu Si" is the name of a native coconut types.

Geography
Most of the area is plain at the foothills, with an area of 109.19 square kilometers or 68,244.50 rai or 378 square kilometers (including Khao Yai National Park).

Surrounding areas include (from north clockwise): Nong Nam Daeng and Khanong Phra in its district, Pong Talong in its district, Nakhon Nayok and Prachinburi Provinces, Phaya Yen in its district, respectively.

Transportation
Thanarat Road (Highway 2090) is a main thoroughfare that cuts through the area including Khao Yai National Park. The road bridging Mu Si with Nakhon Nayok and Prachinburi Provinces.

Administration
Mu Si is governed by the Subdistrict-Municipality Mu Si (เทศบาลตำบลหมูสี).

The area also consists of 19 administrative villages (muban).

References

External links

Tambon of Nakhon Ratchasima Province